Quitacetra arenata is a species of ptychopariid trilobite arthropod from Late Cambrian-aged deposits in Quita Creek, Queensland.

References 

Ptychopariida
Cambrian trilobites of Australia
Fossil taxa described in 1967

Cambrian genus extinctions